The 1918 Queensland state election was held on 16 March 1918.

Since the previous election, the Liberal Party had reconstituted itself as the National Party. The five members of the Queensland Farmers' Union elected in 1915 contested this election as part of the National Party.

By-elections
 On 18 August 1915, George Pollock (Labor) replaced William Hamilton (Labor) as the member for Gregory after the latter's appointment to the Queensland Legislative Council on 10 July 1915.
 On 1 April 1916, Thomas Wilson (Labor) replaced David Bowman (Labor) as the member for Fortitude Valley after the latter's death on 25 February 1916.
 On 31 March 1917, David Weir (Labor) replaced Alfred Jones (Labor) as the member for Maryborough after the latter's appointment to the Queensland Legislative Council on 15 February 1917.
 On 12 May 1917, Frank Forde (Labor) replaced John Adamson (Labor/Independent) as the member for Rockhampton after the latter's resignation to run for the Australian Senate on 21 March 1917.

Retiring Members
Note: Flinders Labor MLA John May died before the election; no by-election was held.

National
Thomas Bridges MLA (Nundah)
James Forsyth MLA (Murrumba)
James Stodart MLA (Logan)

Candidates
Sitting members at the time of the election are shown in bold text.

See also
 1918 Queensland state election
 Members of the Queensland Legislative Assembly, 1915–1918
 Members of the Queensland Legislative Assembly, 1918–1920
 List of political parties in Australia

References
 

Candidates for Queensland state elections